Gary Smith (born 13 July 1966) is Saint Kitts and Nevis football manager and former player who was most recently the manager of  side Tamworth. As a player, he spent most of his career playing as a forward.

Playing career
Smith played for Paget Rangers, Sutton Coldfield Town and Worcester City.

Tamworth
In the summer of 1995, Smith signed for Southern Football League Midland Division side Tamworth. In his first season Smith scored 18 goals in just 37 matches. He remained at the club for a further five seasons, eventually leaving in 2001. making a total of 222 appearances and scoring 70 goals, which was a ratio of almost a goal every three matches.

Gresley Rovers
On 7 August 2002, John Newsome, manager of Southern League Division One West side Gresley Rovers signed Smith. He made his debut on 17 August 2002 against Evesham United, and went on to make 26 appearances for the club, finding the net on seven occasions, before leaving the club on 25 January 2003.

Evesham United
Following unsuccessful interest from Redditch United, it was confirmed that Smith had signed for rivals Evesham United on 16 February 2003.

International career

Saint Kitts and Nevis
He became Tamworth's first international player after being capped for Saint Kitts and Nevis.

Managerial career

Continental Star
Smith moved from assistant manager, to first team manager of Continental Star on 21 June 2014.

Tamworth
On 13 June 2018, Smith's return to The Lamb Ground was announced as the new joint manager of the club's under-21 side, working alongside Gareth Zimmerman. Following the dismissal of first team manager Dennis Greene on 20 January 2019, the following day Smith alongside Andrew Danylyszyn were put in charge as caretaker managers. The management duo's first game in charge was a 2–2 draw with Bedworth United.

On 8 March 2019, following a 5-game unbeaten run while in the caretaker role as managers, Smith and Danylyszyn were announced as joint managers for the club until the end of the season. Danylyszyn and Smith were announced manager of the month for March 2019 following 4 wins and a draw in their first 5 games in charge. Following much improved performances on the pitch, Smith and Danylyszyn steered the club away from relegation and secured a 12th position in their first season in the Southern League Premier Central. It was officially confirmed on 22 April 2019, that Smith and Danylyszyn had been appointed the club's permanent management duo, and would lead the club into the 2019–20 season.

Personal life
Smith's cousin is former Stockport County, Birmingham City and Oxford United forward Kevin Francis.

Smith once appeared on the TV show Deal or No Deal, beating the banker, and dealing at £20,000.

Career statistics

Managerial record

References

External links

1966 births
Living people
Citizens of Saint Kitts and Nevis through descent
Saint Kitts and Nevis footballers
Association football forwards
Saint Kitts and Nevis international footballers
Saint Kitts and Nevis football managers
Footballers from Birmingham, West Midlands
English footballers
Paget Rangers F.C. players
Sutton Coldfield Town F.C. players
Worcester City F.C. players
Tamworth F.C. players
Halesowen Town F.C. players
Gresley F.C. players
Evesham United F.C. players
Grosvenor Park F.C. players
Southern Football League players
English football managers
Tamworth F.C. managers
Black British sportsmen
English sportspeople of Saint Kitts and Nevis descent